The Tarikh-i Sistan (History of Sistan) is an anonymous Persian-language history of the region of Sistan, in modern north-eastern Iran and southern Afghanistan, from legendary and pre-Islamic times through the early Islamic period until 1062.

Sources
 

History of Sistan
11th-century history books
Persian-language books
Medieval history of Iran